Travers Vale (31 January 1865 – 10 January 1927) was an English-born silent film director.  He directed more than 70 films between 1910 and 1926. He was born in Liverpool and died in Hollywood, California from cancer. Travers Vale's actual birth name was Solomon Flohm, son of Joseph Flohm and Esther Flegeltaub who were both Russian Polish Jews who had emigrated to the UK during the Crimean War.

Biography
Soon after Solomon's birth, they set sail to Australia on the SS Great Britain with other family members and ended up settling in Ballarat, Victoria although had spent time prior to this in Sandhurst [Bendigo, Victoria] and Pleasant Creek [Stawell, Victoria].

Travers Vale [Solomon Flohm] married his first cousin, Leah Flegeltaub [daughter of Esther's brother Aaron] on 24 July 1893 in Ballarat, Victoria, Australia. By this time Solomon had been working as a photographer [his father-in-law, Aaron Flegeltaub was a respected photographer].

However Travers had also taken an active interest in stage where he worked for a period as a stage manager in Melbourne. The extended family also had an interest in the Arts - stage and music - so it is fair to say that he would have as a child been influenced by the family around him.

Family myth suggests that his first independent stage production [in which he used the name, Travers Vale] was when he produced a stage version of 'The Mystery of the Hansom Cab' - a ripping murder mystery novel written in Melbourne in the 1880s by Fergus Hume and contains many descriptions of Melbourne life at that time.

Sometime late 1890s / early 1900s, he ventured with his wife [who had changed her name to Leah 'Lily' Vale] to India and then onto London. In London Leah gave birth to their first child, Violet Rachel Vale, in 1894. Some time later they arrived in the USA [probably Alabama] and Leah gave birth to their second child, Olga Vale, in 1900. Sadly Leah died in Alabama on 13 May 1904.

Travers and his girls moved soon after to New York where he became involved in the early days of Vaudeville before the film industry headed en-masse across the continent to Hollywood in the 1920s. Travers married twice thereafter but no further children are known to exist from these marriages.

Selected filmography

 Streets of New York (1913)
 The Abandoned Well (1913)
 Père Goriot (1915)
 The Scarlet Oath (1916)
 The Men She Married (1916)
 The Bondage of Fear (1917)
 Man's Woman (1917)
 The Dormant Power (1917)
 The Divorce Game (1917)
 Darkest Russia (1917)
 The Dancer's Peril (1917)
 Easy Money (1917)
 A Self-Made Widow (1917)
 The Woman Beneath (1917)
 Betsy Ross (1917)
 Life (1920)
 A Pasteboard Crown (1922)
 The Street of Tears (1924)
 Barriers of the Law (1925)
 Western Pluck (1926)

External links

1865 births
1927 deaths
British film directors
Deaths from cancer in California
20th-century English male actors